Trichaea hades is a moth in the family Crambidae first described by Herbert Druce in 1889. It is found in the Mexican state of Tabasco and Costa Rica.

References

Moths described in 1889
Spilomelinae
Moths of Central America